Albert Edward Hankey (24 May 1914 – 1998) was an English footballer who played as a goalkeeper for Stoke City, Charlton Athletic, Southend United, and Tonbridge.

Career
Hankey played for Stoke City, Charlton Athletic, and Southend United. He played four matches as a guest for Port Vale during World War II. He later played for Tonbridge.

Career statistics
Source:

References

1914 births
1998 deaths
Footballers from Stoke-on-Trent
English footballers
Association football goalkeepers
Stoke City F.C. players
Charlton Athletic F.C. players
Southend United F.C. players
Port Vale F.C. wartime guest players
Tonbridge Angels F.C. players
English Football League players
Southern Football League players